Valkó County was an administrative unit (county) of the medieval Kingdom of Hungary. It was established in the 13th century, and included most territories of the present day Vukovar-Syrmia County, in modern Croatia, and western parts of the present day Syrmia District, in modern Serbia. The most important cities of the county were Vukovar and Ilok. Its territory was conquered by the Ottoman Turks in the first half of the 16th century. 

The region was liberated during the Austro-Turkish War (1683-1699), but the county was not reestablished, since its territory was incorporated into the newly created Syrmia County.

See also

 Syrmia County (medieval)
 Sanjak of Syrmia
 Syrmia County
 Vukovar-Syrmia County
 Banate of Macsó
 House of Ilok
 Thomas Monoszló
 Lawrence of Transylvania
 Ugrin Csák
 Garai family

References

Sources

External links
 Magyar Katolikus Lexikon: Valkó vármegye

Counties of the Kingdom of Hungary in the Middle Ages
History of Slavonia
History of Syrmia
States and territories established in the 13th century
States and territories disestablished in the 16th century